William Macleod (27 October 1850 – 24 June 1929), was an Australian artist and a partner in The Bulletin.  He was described as generous, hospitable, a 'big man with a ponderous overhang of waistfront, a trim, grey beard, the curling moustachios of a cuirassier, and brown, kindly eyes gleaming through his spectacles'.

Early life

Macleod was born in London. His father was of a Scottish Highlands family and his mother Cornish/German. The family emigrated to Australia in 1854 or 1855, drawn by the potential for riches from the Victorian goldrush, but Macleod's father died a year later.

His mother moved to Sydney and was remarried to James Anderson, a portrait painter. Anderson's heavy drinking and the family's parlous financial state forced Macleod to find work at the age of 12. He found employment as an assistant to a professional photographer, and began studying at a school of the arts. His studies led to the production of a number of paintings and stained glass designs, and by the age of 17 Macleod was earning enough from commissions to purchase a home for his mother, away from her husband. For a time he also worked as a drawing master in schools.

Career

When Macleod was still in his early twenties he began contributing drawings to The Sydney Mail, the Illustrated Sydney News, the Town and Country Journal and others. He also obtained a reputation as a portrait painter whose work was hung at exhibitions of the Art Societies in both Sydney and Melbourne. For many years he was hardworking and successful. 

When The Bulletin started in 1880, he had a drawing in the first number and for the next two years was a regular contributor. Months after The Bulletin was launched, he and another artist, Samuel Begg, purchased a third share of the magazine, but relinquished it when the founders, J. F. Archibald and John Haynes were more financially secure. He then became one of the artists for the Picturesque Atlas of Australasia and did a large number of illustrations for it, including most of the portraits. When he was approaching the end of this work, J. F. Archibald, who had been impressed by his business methods when a contributor to the Bulletin, asked him to join the staff.

He became business manager in September 1887, soon acquired an interest in the paper, and for nearly 40 years was actively engaged in the management of it. 
He also read all the proofs with a watchful eye for possible libel actions. At one period he owned 75% of the paper but, recognising the value of Archibald's work for it, he handed over to him 25% as a gift. He practically gave up working as an artist, but took a special interest in the cartoonists. His greatest discovery was cartoonist David Low.

He published the literary magazine The Bookfellow from January 1899 to May 1899 as an adjunct to The Bulletins "Red Pages".

Late life

In 1901, known as 'Mr Bulletin McLeod', he was the toastmaster at the send-off dinner at the Hotel Australia to Scottish Border poet and Australian bush balladeer Will H. Ogilvie (1869–1963).  Ogilvie was one of The Bulletins stable of poets.

Macleod took up painting again, became interested in sculpture, and did a good deal of modelling.  This included by 'Mac' a side profile of close friend and The Bulletin cartoonist 'Hop' Hopkins.  Recreationally he enjoyed lawn bowls, being a founding member of one club and president for eight years, and president for seven years of another.

In 1923, Macleod was a finalist in the third annual Archibald Prize, named for fellow Bulletin founder, along with G. W. Lambert and others.  His subject was again close friend 'Hop' Hopkins.

He was married twice; firstly to Emily Collins in 1873 (d. April 1910), and secondly in 1911 to author Agnes Conor O'Brien.  In 1926 he retired from The Bulletin, and died on 24 June 1929, aged 78, at his house 'Dunvegan', Musgrave Street, Mosman, Sydney.  Macleod was survived by O'Brien, son Ronald Henry Macleod (d. 1941) and two daughters, Annie May and Amy Isabel Macleod, of the first marriage.  Son Norman, aged 35, and daughter Ada, aged about 40, both died in 1919 from influenza.  O'Brien died in March 1934 at Mosman.

References

 Additional reading 
 
B. G. Andrews, 'Macleod, William (1850 - 1929)', Australian Dictionary of Biography, Volume 10, MUP, 1986, pp 335–336.Additional resources listed by the Australian Dictionary of Biography
G. A. Taylor, Those Were the Days (Syd, 1918)
M. Mahood, The Loaded Line (Melb, 1973)
P. Rolfe, The Journalistic Javelin (Syd, 1979)
S. Lawson, The Archibald Paradox (Melb, 1983)
Scottish Australasian, 1 April 1911
Newspaper News, 1 July 1929
Bowyang, 7, 1982
Daily Telegraph (Sydney), 21 June 1924
Bulletin, 26 June 1929
manuscript catalogue under Macleod (State Library of New South Wales)

1850 births
1929 deaths
Australian businesspeople
19th-century Australian painters
19th-century Australian male artists
20th-century Australian painters
20th-century Australian male artists
Archibald Prize finalists
British emigrants to colonial Australia
Australian male painters